The fourth season of NYPD Blue premiered on ABC on October 15, 1996, and concluded on May 20, 1997.

Episodes

References

NYPD Blue seasons
1996 American television seasons
1997 American television seasons